Artur Kyshenko (Ukrainian: Артур Кишенко, born November 14, 1986) is a Ukrainian middleweight kickboxer, fighting out of Kyshenko Gym. He is the 2015 Kunlun Fight 80 kg Tournament World Champion and K-1 World MAX 2008 Finalist.

He was ranked as the #1 Welterweight in the world by Combat Press from September 2017 until February 2020, when he transitioned into boxing. He had been continually ranked in the welterweight top ten by Combat Press since September 2014.

On 24 July 2019, Kyshenko was suspended for 4 years by National Anti-Doping Agency of France (AFLD) after testing positive for prohibited substances.

Kickboxing career

Early career
Artur started boxing at age eleven, turning to Kickboxing a year later at the Captain Odessa gym in his home town of Odessa, Ukraine where he was trained by the Romanian Ukrainian Pavel A. Bătrînu.  In 2003, aged just 16, he entered the I.F.M.A. Amateur Muaythai World Championships held in Almaty, Kazakhstan finishing with a bronze medal in the 63.5 kg category. He followed this up the next year by winning a gold medal in the I.F.M.A. European championships and becoming Fighting Arts world champion. He was quickly becoming Ukraine's most promising young fighter and his winning of two national championships in 2005 and 2006 reinforced this view.

K-1
It was not until 2006 that Artur became known internationally, making his K-1 MAX debut at the K-1 East Europe MAX 2006 event. Artur won the event in Vilnius, Lithuania in dominating fashion, stopping all three opponents on the night to book his place at a reserve fight at K-1 MAX's premier event.  He also won gold on the amateur circuit – this time coming top of the 71 kg at the I.F.M.A. World Championships held in Bangkok, Thailand.  He then made an appearance at the K-1 World MAX 2006 Final defeated the wily veteran and multiple world champion Rayen Simson in their reserve match.

2007 was another useful year for Artur who made a number of victorious appearances at K-1 MAX events including an elimination fight win over K-1 MAX Seoul champion Su Hwan Lee at the K-1 World MAX 2007 World Tournament Final Elimination which meant he qualified for the quarter finals stages of the K-1 MAX 2007 final. Artur made the semi finals defeating the hardhitting Mike Zambidis before losing to former champ and Japanese kickboxing legend Masato by KO despite being ahead on the judges score cards early on in the bout.  He finished the year by winning gold for the second year in a row at the I.F.M.A World Championships.

Artur returned to K-1 action the next year defeating Jordan Tai and Yasuhiro Kido at elimination fights to make the final 4 in Tokyo. He met reigning MAX champion Andy Souwer in the semi finals outworking the heavily favoured Dutchman to claim an extension round victory and face the previous year's finalist Masato in a rematch. Artur performed excellently in the final bout dropping Masato in the second but as he was unable to press his home his advantage the match went into an extension round which the local fighter won by a unanimous decision – a result some felt should never have gone into an extra round as the Ukrainian may have done enough over three rounds to have claimed victory. He entered the final again the following year destroying Alviar Lima in the final 16 before losing to Andy Souwer in the quarter finals.

Of recent Artur has been on somewhat of a recent downward spiral with reports of the 5'11 Ukrainian having difficulties making the 70 kg weight limit and a mixed patch of results which saw victories over Murat Direkçi and Marcus Öberg being tempered with defeats to the un-fancied Hinata Watanabe and Mohammed Khamal – the latter costing him a quarter final place at the K-1 World MAX Final 2010. He has also switched gyms, moving from Captain Odessa in the Ukraine to Mike's Gym in Amsterdam at the tail-end of 2010.  Kyshenko has been on a roll with his new gym, picking up wins against strong opposition such as Gago Drago and Nieky Holzken.

Even though Kyshenko's stance is mostly orthodox, many claim that due to the recent change of gyms, he is now a dual-stance, as seen in his fight against Gago Drago. (Editor's note: dual-stance meaning he uses both the orthodox and south-paw stance.)

He made short work of Chris Ngimbi in the quarter-finals of the K-1 World MAX 2012 World Championship Tournament Final before outpointing Andy Souwer in the semis, in the fourth match of their rivalry. He was then KO'd by his stable mate Murthel Groenhart in the final in Athens, Greece on December 15, 2012.

It's Showtime and other promotions
Kyshenko lost to Abraham Roqueñi via a controversial split decision at Enfusion Live: Barcelona in Barcelona, Spain on March 9, 2012. He also missed the contracted weight of 70 kg/154 lb by 2.5 kg/5.5 lb.

Kyshenko defeated Denis Makouski via TKO due to injury in round one at K-1 World Grand Prix 2013 in Vilnius, Lithuania on April 27, 2013 to win the KOK -71 kg title.

He competed in the -71 kg tournament at the Legend Fighting Show in Moscow, Russia on May 25, 2013, facing Yuri Bessmertny in the semi-finals. He defeated Yuri Bessmertny via an extra round unanimous decision the semi-finals but was injured in the bout and could not fight in the final, replaced Alim Nabiev.

He signed with Glory in November 2013 to compete in their -77 kg/170 lb welterweight division.

At the KOK World Grand Prix 2013 in Magdeburg, Germany on November 23, 2013, Kyshenko dropped Syrian-German journeyman Baker Bakarat with a body kick before winning by a TKO due to a cut in round one.

In his promotional debut with Glory, Kyshenko took a unanimous decision over Kenmun at Glory 13: Tokyo in Tokyo, Japan on December 21, 2013.

He knocked out Wen Jindo with a first round high kick at Hero Legends in Jinan, China on December 3, 2014.

He lost to Karapet Karapetyan by unanimous decision on the Glory 14: Zagreb undercard in Zagreb, Croatia on March 8, 2014.

He was scheduled to fight Dzhabar Askerov at Legend 3: Pour Homme in Milan, Italy on April 5, 2014 but conceded that he would be unable to make the contracted weight of -71 kg/156 lb and was replaced by his stablemate Murthel Groenhart.

Kyshenko was scheduled to fight Radoslaw Paczuski during 2014 KOK WGP in Gdnask. He won the fight by TKO, after Radoslaw's corner threw in the towel in the third round.

He fought with King of Kings again two months later, when he took on Andrei Leuştean. He defeated Andrei by unanimous decision.

Kunlun Fight
Kyshenko fought Bai Jinbin during Kunlun Fight 18. He won the fight with a right hook KO. He won his second fight with Kunlun Fight as well, by knocking Jonatan Oliveira out in the third round. Kyshenko beat Dmitry Valent during Kunlun Fight 25 by split decision.

After winning his next three fights against Cédric Tousch, Ruben Lee and Hicham El Gaoui, Kyshenko participated in the 2015 Kunlun Fight 80 kg tournament. He defeated Eyevan Danenberg by KO in the semifinals, and Dmitry Valent by KO in the finals.

After winning the tournament, Kyshenko would extend his winning streak to 18 straight fights without a loss. He defeated Murthel Groenhart by an extra round decision at Kunlun Fight 43, Jonatan Oliveira by decision at Kunlun Fight 45, Alex Pereira by TKO at Kunlun Fight 48, Zakaria Baitar by TKO at Kunlun Fight 60, Gabriele Casella by decision at Kunlun Fight 62, Constantino Nanga by KO at Rumble Of The Kings, Andrey Chekhonin by KO at Kunlun Fight 68, and Timur Aylyarov by TKO at Kunlun Fight 74.

During MAS Fight Ling Shan Grand Prix, Kyshenko took part in a three on one match. He fought consecutively a round with each of the three opponents including Rambo, with a win being awarded to either him or one of his opponents, should a KO be scored. The fight ended in a draw since no one managed a KO.

Arena Fight
Kyshenko fought Yohan Lidon for the Arena Fight Middleweight Kickboxing Title in June 2019. He beat Lidon by a unanimous decision.

Doping suspension
On 5 March 2021, it was announced that the Arena Fight Championship stripped its middleweight title from Artur Kyshenko and installed Yohan Lidon as champion after Kyshenko failed a doping test. The Ukrainian was suspended by National Anti-Doping Agency of France (AFLD) until July 24, 2023.

Titles
Professional 
2015 Kunlun Fight -80kg Tournament World Champion
2013 King of Kings -71 kg champion
2012 K-1 World MAX Final runner up
2011 It's Showtime "Fast & Furious 70MAX" runner up
2008 K-1 World MAX Final runner up
2006 K-1 East Europe MAX champion
2004 Fighting Arts world champion

Amateur
2010 SportAccord Combat Games in Beijing, China  -71 kg
2007 I.F.M.A. World Muay Thai Championships in Bangkok, Thailand  -71 kg
2006 I.F.M.A. World Muay Thai Championships in Bangkok, Thailand  -71 kg
2006 Ukrainian Muay Thai Championships in Odessa, Ukraine  -71 kg
2005 Ukrainian Muay Thai Championships in Odessa, Ukraine  -75 kg
2004 I.F.M.A. World Muay Thai Championships in Bangkok, Thailand  -67 kg
2004 I.F.M.A. European Muay Thai Championships 
2003 I.F.M.A. World Muay Thai Championships in Almaty, Kazakhstan  -63.5 kg

Professional boxing record

Professional kickboxing record

|-
|-  style="background:#c5d2ea;"
| 2019-06-08 || No Contest||align=left| Yohan Lidon || Arena Fight || Aix-en-Provence, France || Decision (Unanimous)|| 5 || 3:00
|-
! style=background:white colspan=9 |
|-  style="background:#c5d2ea;"
| 2019-05-01 || Draw||align=left| Florin Lambagiu Ruben Lee Sun Chao || MAS Fight Ling Shan Grand Prix || Sichuan, China || Draw || 3 || 3:00
|-  style="background:#cfc;"
| 2018-05-13|| Win ||align=left| Timur Aylyarov || Kunlun Fight 74 || China || TKO (Punches) || 3 || 2:40
|-
|-  style="background:#cfc;"
| 2017-12-17|| Win ||align=left| Andrei Chekhonin || Kunlun Fight 68 || China || KO (Left Body Hook)  || 1 || 1:29
|-  style="background:#cfc;"
| 2017-11-25 || Win ||align=left| Constantino Nanga || Rumble Of The Kings  || Sweden || KO (Left Hook) || 3 ||
|-  style="background:#cfc;"
| 2017-06-10 || Win ||align=left| Gabriele Casella || Kunlun Fight 62  || Bangkok, Thailand || Decision (Unanimous) || 3 || 3:00
|-  style="background:#cfc;"
| 2017-04-23 || Win||align=left| Zakaria Baitar || Kunlun Fight 60 || Guizhou, China || TKO (Right Cross + Left Body Hook) || 2 || 1:15
|-  style="background:#cfc;"
| 2016-07-31 || Win ||align=left| Alex Pereira || Kunlun Fight 48 || Jining, China || TKO (punches)|| 2 || 2:55
|-  style="background:#cfc;"
| 2016-06-05 || Win ||align=left| Jonatan Oliveira || Kunlun Fight 45 || Chengdou, China || Decision (Unanimous) || 3 || 3:00
|-  style="background:#cfc;"
| 2016-04-23 || Win ||align=left| Murthel Groenhart || Kunlun Fight 43 || Zhoukou, China || Extra Round Decision || 4 || 3:00
|-|-  style="background:#cfc;"
| 2015-12-19 || Win ||align=left| Dmitry Valent || Kunlun Fight 35 – 80 kg Tournament,Final || Luoyang, China || KO(Punches) || 1 || 0:22
|-
! style=background:white colspan=9 |
|-  style="background:#cfc;"
| 2015-12-19 || Win ||align=left| Eyevan Danenberg || Kunlun Fight 35 – 80 kg Tournament,Semi Final || Luoyang, China || KO(Right hook) || 2 || 3:00
|-  style="background:#cfc;"
| 2015-11-21 || Win ||align=left| Hicham El Gaoui || Enfusion Live 34  || Groningen, Netherlands || Decision || 3 || 3:00 
|-  style="background:#cfc;"
| 2015-10-24 || Win ||align=left| Ruben Lee || IFC 3  || Barcelona, Spain || Decision || 3 || 3:00
|-  style="background:#cfc;"
| 2015-09-12 || Win ||align=left| Cédric Tousch|| Its Fight Time  || Germany, || Decision(Unanimous) || 3 || 3:00
|-  style="background:#cfc;"
| 2015-05-15 || Win ||align=left| Dmitry Valent || Kunlun Fight 25 || Bratislava, Slovakia || Decision (split) || 3 || 3:00
|-  style="background:#cfc;"
| 2015-04-26 || Win ||align=left| Jonatan Oliveira || Kunlun Fight 23 – 80 kg Tournament, Quarter Finals || Chansha, Hunan, China || KO (Left body hook) || 3 || 1:20
|-  style="background:#cfc;"
| 2015-02-01 || Win ||align=left| Bai Jinbin || Kunlun Fight 18 || Guangzhou, China || KO (Right Hook) || 1 || 2:48
|-  style="background:#cfc;"
| 2014-12-20 || Win ||align=left| Andrei Leuştean || KOK World GP 2014 in Chișinău  || Chișinău, Moldova || Decision (unanimous) ||3 || 3:00
|-  style="background:#cfc;"
| 2014-10-17 || Win ||align=left| Radoslaw Paczuski  || KOK World GP 2014 in Gdańsk || Gdańsk, Poland || TKO (towel thrown) || 3  || 0:38
|-  style="background:#fbb;"
| 2014-03-08 || Loss ||align=left| Karapet Karapetyan || Glory 14: Zagreb || Zagreb, Croatia || Decision (unanimous) || 3 || 3:00
|-  style="background:#cfc;"
| 2014-01-03 ||Win||align=left| Wen Jindo || Hero Legends || Jinan, China || KO (right high kick) || 1 || 1:23
|-  style="background:#cfc;"
| 2013-12-21 || Win ||align=left| Kenmun || Glory 13: Tokyo || Tokyo, Japan || Decision (unanimous) || 3 || 3:00
|-  style="background:#cfc;"
| 2013-11-23 || Win ||align=left| Baker Barakat || KOK World Grand Prix 2013 || Magdeburg, Germany || TKO (cut) || 1 || 
|-  style="background:#cfc;"
| 2013-05-25 || Win ||align=left| Yuri Bessmertny || Legend 1, Semi Finals || Moscow, Russia || Ext. r. decision (unanimous) || 4 || 3:00
|-  style="background:#cfc;"
| 2013-04-27 || Win ||align=left| Denis Makouski || K-1 World Grand Prix 2013 in Vilnius || Vilnius, Lithuania || TKO (injury) || 1 ||
|-
! style=background:white colspan=9 |
|-  style="background:#fbb;"
| 2013-03-09 || Loss ||align=left| Abraham Roqueñi || Enfusion Live: Barcelona || Barcelona, Spain || Decision (split) || 3 || 3:00
|-  style="background:#fbb;"
| 2012-12-15 || Loss ||align=left| Murthel Groenhart || K-1 World MAX 2012 World Championship Tournament Final, Final || Athens, Greece || KO (right overhand) || 3 || 0:54
|-
! style=background:white colspan=9 |
|-  style="background:#cfc;"
| 2012-12-15 || Win ||align=left| Andy Souwer || K-1 World MAX 2012 World Championship Tournament Final, Semi Finals || Athens, Greece || Decision (unanimous) || 3 || 3:00
|-  style="background:#cfc;"
| 2012-12-15 || Win ||align=left| Chris Ngimbi || K-1 World MAX 2012 World Championship Tournament Final, Quarter Finals || Athens, Greece || TKO (referee stoppage) || 2 || 1:48
|-  style="background:#cfc;"
| 2012-05-27 || Win ||align=left| Su Hwan Lee || K-1 World MAX 2012 World Championship Tournament Final 16, First Round || Madrid, Spain || KO (Left punch) || 2 ||
|-  style="background:#fbb;"
| 2012-03-24 || Loss ||align=left| Giorgio Petrosyan || Fight Code || Milan, Italy || Decision (Unanimous) || 3 || 3:00
|-  style="background:#cfc;"
| 2012-02-05 || Win ||align=left| Roberto Cocco || Thai Boxe Mania || Turin, Italy || Decision (Unanimous) || 3 || 3:00
|-  style="background:#cfc;"
| 2011-11-26 || Win ||align=left| Yodsanklai Fairtex || Rumble of the Kings 2011 || Stockholm, Sweden || Decision (Unanimous) || 3 || 3:00
|-  style="background:#fbb;"
| 2011-09-24 || Loss ||align=left| Robin van Roosmalen || It's Showtime "Fast & Furious 70MAX" Final || Brussels, Belgium || KO (Left hook) || 1 || 2:20
|-
! style=background:white colspan=9 |
|-
|-  style="text-align:center; background:#cfc;"
| 2011-09-24 || Win ||align=left| Andy Souwer || It's Showtime "Fast & Furious 70MAX" Semi-final || Brussels, Belgium || Decision (Unanimous) || 3 || 3:00
|-  style="background:#cfc;"
| 2011-09-24 || Win ||align=left| Gago Drago || It's Showtime "Fast & Furious 70MAX" Quarter-final|| Brussels, Belgium || TKO (referee stoppage) || 3 || 1:03
|-  style="background:#cfc;"
| 2011-05-28 || Win ||align=left| Nieky Holzken || United Glory 14: 2010–2011 World Series Finals || Moscow, Russia || Decision (Unanimous) || 3 || 3:00
|-  style="background:#cfc;"
| 2011-03-06 || Win ||align=left| Gago Drago || It's Showtime Sporthallen Zuid || Amsterdam, Netherlands || Decision (5-0) || 3|| 3:00
|-  style="background:#cfc;"
| 2010-11-27 ||Win ||align=left| Marcus Öberg || K-1 Scandinavia Rumble of the Kings 2010 || Stockholm, Sweden ||Decision || 3 ||3:00
|-  style="background:#fbb;"
| 2010-10-03 || Loss ||align=left| Mohammed Khamal || K-1 World MAX 2010 Final 16 - Part 2 || Seoul, South Korea || Decision (Unanimous) || 3 || 3:00
|-
! style=background:white colspan=9 |
|-  style="background:#fbb;"
| 2010-07-31 || Loss ||align=left| Hinata Watanabe || KRS: "RISE 68" || Bunkyo, Tokyo, Japan || TKO (Left middle kick) || 3 || 1:23
|-  style="background:#cfc;"
| 2010-05-29 ||Win ||align=left| Murat Direkçi || It's Showtime 2010 Amsterdam || Amsterdam, Netherlands ||Decision (4-1) ||3 ||3:00
|-  style="background:#cfc;"
| 2009-12-12 || Win ||align=left| Vladimir Moravcik || K-1 ColliZion 2009 Final Tournament, Super Fight || Prague, Czech Republic || KO (Right high kick) || 2 || 2:43
|-  style="background:#cfc;"
| 2009-11-20 || Win ||align=left| Abdoulile Joof || K-1 Rumble of the Kings 2009 in Stockholm, Super Fight || Stockholm, Sweden || Decision (Unanimous) || 3 || 3:00
|-  style="background:#cfc;"
| 2009-10-26 || Win ||align=left| Toofan Salafzoon || K-1 World MAX 2009 Final, Super Fight || Yokohama, Japan || KO (Right cross) || 3 || 1:50
|-  style="background:#fbb;"
| 2009-07-13 || Loss ||align=left| Andy Souwer || K-1 World MAX 2009 Final 8 || Tokyo, Japan || Ext R. Decision (Unanimous) || 4 || 3:00
|-
! style=background:white colspan=9 |
|-
|-  style="text-align:center; background:#cfc;"
| 2009-04-21 || Win ||align=left| Alviar Lima || K-1 World MAX 2009 Final 16 || Fukuoka, Japan || TKO (Ref. stop/two knockdowns) || 1 || 2:56
|-
! style=background:white colspan=9 |
|-  style="background:#cfc;"
| 2008-12-31 || Win ||align=left| Yoshihiro Sato || Dynamite!! 2008 || Saitama, Japan || Decision (Majority) || 3 || 3:00
|-  style="background:#cfc;"
| 2008-11-22 || Win ||align=left| Vadim Chromyh || K-1 World GP 2008 in Riga || Riga, Latvia || KO (Kicks) || 2 ||
|-  style="background:#fbb;"
| 2008-10-01 || Loss ||align=left| Masato || K-1 World MAX 2008 Final, Final || Tokyo, Japan || Ext R. Decision (Unanimous) || 4 || 3:00
|-
! style=background:white colspan=9 |
|-  style="background:#cfc;"
| 2008-10-01 || Win ||align=left| Andy Souwer || K-1 World MAX 2008 Final, Semi Finals || Tokyo, Japan || Ext R. Decision (Unanimous) || 4 || 3:00
|-  style="background:#cfc;"
| 2008-07-07 || Win ||align=left| Yasuhiro Kido || K-1 World MAX 2008 Final 8 || Tokyo, Japan || Decision (Unanimous) || 3 || 3:00
|-
! style=background:white colspan=9 |
|-  style="background:#cfc;"
| 2008-04-09 || Win ||align=left| Jordan Tai || K-1 World MAX 2008 Final 16 || Tokyo, Japan || Ext R. Decision (Unanimous) || 4 || 3:00
|-
! style=background:white colspan=9 |
|-  style="background:#cfc;"
| 2008-02-02 || Win ||align=left| Shingo Garyu || K-1 World MAX 2008 Japan Tournament, Super Fight || Tokyo, Japan || KO (Left hook) || 1 || 3:00
|-  style="background:#fbb;"
| 2007-10-03 || Loss ||align=left| Masato || K-1 World MAX 2007 World Championship Final, Semi Finals || Tokyo, Japan || KO (Left hook) || 2 || 0:41
|-  style="background:#cfc;"
| 2007-10-03 || Win ||align=left| Mike Zambidis || K-1 World MAX 2007 World Championship Final, Quarter Finals || Tokyo, Japan || Ext R. Decision (Unanimous) || 4 || 3:00
|-  style="background:#cfc;"
| 2007-07-21 || Win ||align=left| Chi Bin Lim || K-1 Fighting Network KHAN 2007 || Seoul, Korea || TKO (Low kicks)|| 2 || 1:04
|-  style="background:#cfc;"
| 2007-06-28 || Win ||align=left| Su Hwan Lee || K-1 World MAX 2007 World Tournament Open || Tokyo, Japan || KO (Left hook) || 3 || 1:11
|-
! style=background:white colspan=9 |
|-  style="background:#cfc;"
| 2007-03-17 || Win ||align=left| Sandris Tomsons || K-1 East Europe MAX 2007, Super Fight || Vilnius, Lithuania || TKO (Ref stop/Three knockdowns) || 1 ||
|-  style="background:#fbb;"
| 2006-12-20 || Loss ||align=left| Mikhail Chalykh || W.K.B.F. World title (76 kg) Semi-finals || Moscow, Russia || Ext R. Decision (Split) || 4 || 3:00
|-  style="background:#fbb;"
| 2006-09-04 || Loss ||align=left| Hayato || K-1 World MAX 2006 Champions' Challenge || Tokyo, Japan || Ext R. Decision (Unanimous) || 4 || 3:00
|-  style="background:#cfc;"
| 2006-06-30 || Win ||align=left| Rayen Simson || K-1 World MAX 2006 World Tournament Final, Reserve Fight || Yokohama, Japan || Decision (Majority) || 3 || 3:00
|-  style="background:#c5d2ea;"
| 2006-05-10 || NC ||align=left| Ibrahim Tamazaev || W.B.K.F. European title @ Club "Arbat" || Moscow, Russia || No contest (Head butt) || 1 ||
|-  style="background:#cfc;"
| 2006-03-29 || Win ||align=left| Aleksander Demchenko || Fight Club Arbat || Moscow, Russia || TKO || 3 ||
|-  style="background:#cfc;"
| 2006-03-10 || Win ||align=left| Marius Buzinskas || K-1 East Europe MAX 2006, Final || Vilnius, Lithuania || TKO (Corner stoppage) || 1 || 1:42
|-
! style=background:white colspan=9 |
|-  style="background:#cfc;"
| 2006-03-10 || Win ||align=left| Jurij Bulat || K-1 East Europe MAX 2006, Semi Finals || Vilnius, Lithuania || TKO (Doctor stoppage) || 3 || 1:16
|-  style="background:#cfc;"
| 2006-03-10 || Win ||align=left| Egidijus Brandisauskas || K-1 East Europe MAX 2006, Quarter Finals || Vilnius, Lithuania || KO (Liver punch) || 1 || 2:20
|-  style="background:#c5d2ea;"
| 2005-12-09 || Draw ||align=left| Denis Laevskiy || "Ukraine vs Belarus" || Sevastopol, Ukraine || Decision draw || 3 || 3:00
|-  style="background:#fbb;"
| 2004-02-11 || Loss ||align=left| Alen Ofoio || "Ukraine vs Kyrgyz" @ Club "Arbat" || Moscow, Russia || Decision (Unanimous) || 3 || 3:00
|-
| colspan=9 | Legend:

Amateur kickboxing record
{{Kickboxing record start|norec=y|title=Amateur Kickboxing Record|record=119 Wins, 13 Losses}}
|-  style="background:#fbb;"
| 2010-08-29 ||Loss||align=left| Teerapong "Chalermdet" Dee || SportAccord Combat Games 2010, Semi Finals || Beijing, China ||Decision (Unanimous) || 4 || 2:00
|-
! style=background:white colspan=9 |
|-  style="background:#cfc;"
| 2010-08-29 ||Win ||align=left| Almaz Smagulov || SportAccord Combat Games 2010, Quarter Finals || Beijing, China ||Decision (Unanimous) || 4 || 2:00
|-  style="background:#cfc;"
| 2007-12-05 || Win ||align=left| Dias Kassenov || W.M.C.-I.F.M.A. World Muay Thai Championships, Final || Bangkok, Thailand || Decision || 5 || 2:00
|-
! style=background:white colspan=9 |
|-  style="background:#cfc;"
| 2007-12-02 || Win ||align=left| Alex Schmidt || W.M.C.-I.F.M.A. World Muay Thai Championships, Semi Finals || Bangkok, Thailand || Decision || 5 || 2:00
|-  style="background:#cfc;"
| 2007-11-27 || Win ||align=left| Ghader Mirshamsi || W.M.C.-I.F.M.A. World Muay Thai Championships, Quarter Finals || Bangkok, Thailand || TKO (Referee stoppage) || 2 ||
|-  style="background:#cfc;"
| 2006-06-07 || Win ||align=left| Karim Bezouh || W.M.C.-I.F.M.A. World Muay Thai Championships, Final || Bangkok, Thailand || TKO (No show) || 1 || 0:00
|-
! style=background:white colspan=9 |
|-  style="background:#cfc;"
| 2006-06-05 || Win ||align=left| Mohamed Rahhaoui || W.M.C.-I.F.M.A. World Muay Thai Championships, Semi Finals || Bangkok, Thailand || TKO || 3 ||
|-  style="background:#cfc;"
| 2006-06-03 || Win ||align=left| Dias Kassenov || W.M.C.-I.F.M.A. World Muay Thai Championships, Quarter Finals || Bangkok, Thailand || KO (Punch) || 4 ||
|-  style="background:#cfc;"
| 2006-06-02 || Win ||align=left| Constantin Țuțu || W.M.C.-I.F.M.A. World Muay Thai Championships, 1st Round || Bangkok, Thailand || TKO (Low kicks) || 2 ||
|-  style="background:#cfc;"
| 2006-04-02 || Win ||align=left| Oleksandr Medvedev || 11th Ukrainian Muay Thai Championships || Odessa, Ukraine || || ||
|-
! style=background:white colspan=9 |
|-  style="background:#cfc;"
| 2005-04-03 || Win ||align=left| Dmytro Kirpan || 10th Ukrainian Muay Thai Championships || Odessa, Ukraine || || ||
|-
! style=background:white colspan=9 |
|-
| colspan=9 | Legend''':

See also 
List of K-1 events
List of K-1 champions
List of It's Showtime events
List of male kickboxers

References

External links

1986 births
Living people
Ukrainian male kickboxers
Lightweight kickboxers
Welterweight kickboxers
Middleweight kickboxers
Sportspeople from Odesa
Ukrainian expatriates in the Netherlands
Glory kickboxers
Kunlun Fight kickboxers
Ukrainian male boxers
Light-heavyweight boxers
Doping cases in kickboxing
King of Kings champions
Kunlun Fight kickboxing champions